Hans Waldmann may refer to:

 Hans Waldmann (mayor) (1435–1489), mayor of Zurich and Swiss military leader
 Hans Waldmann (fighter pilot) (1922–1945), German Luftwaffe fighter pilot